SWS, sWS, or SWs my refer to:

Education
 Sacramento Waldorf School, Pre-K-12 coeducational private school in Sacramento, California.
 School within a School, a democratic education program at Brookline High School

Machines
 M21 Sniper Weapon System, a US Army sniper rifle
 M24 Sniper Weapon System, a US Army sniper rifle
 Schwere Wehrmachtschlepper German half-track vehicle deployed late into World War II
 SWS (trolleybus), a hybrid trolleybus prototype

Technology
 Scientific Workflow System, scientific application software that composes, executes, and manages workflows.
 Seawater scale, a measure of concentration of H+, HSO4+, and HF
 Semantic Web service, a Web service that can be published, discovered, composed, and executed by Web applications
 Sentient World Simulation, a project to be based on Synthetic Environment for Analysis and Simulations
 Silly window syndrome, a TCP flow control problem in computer networks
 Sine wave speech, a speech synthesis technique that replaces formants with pure tone whistles
 Smart wearable system, an extension of the wearable computer

Other uses
 Safe Water System, initiative by the US Centers for Disease Control and Prevention to improve water quality
 Schweizerische Wagons- und Aufzügefabrik AG Schlieren-Zürich, a now defunct Swiss railway rolling stock manufacturer
 Seann William Scott (1976–), US actor
 Shaun White Snowboarding, a 2008 video game
 Sleeping With Sirens, an American post-hardcore band
 Slow-wave sleep, deep sleep
 Social Weather Stations, a social research institution in the Philippines
 Society of Wetland Scientists, a US non-profit organization
 Southern Water Services, a private utility company responsible for public wastewater collection and treatment in South England
 SouthWest Service, a Metra route to Manhattan, Illinois
 Sozialwerke Pfarrer Sieber, a Swiss charity and relief organization founded by Pastor Ernst Sieber
 Super World of Sports, a Japanese professional wrestling promotion
 SWS, IATA airport code for Swansea Airport
 SWs, listener missives that express appreciation for Sarah Kennedy's breakfast show on BBC Radio 2